was a district located in Wakasa Province (now Fukui Prefecture), Japan until 2005.

The time before the dissolution, the district had an area of 143.83 km2 with an estimated population of 2,747 with an area of 1,088 and a density of 49.08 persons per square kilometer. The total area is 225.91 km2.

Towns and villages 
Prior to its dissolution, the district ended up with only one village:

 Natashō

History

Recent mergers 
 On March 31, 2005 - The town of Kaminaka was merged with the town of Mikata (from Mikata District) to create the town of Wakasa (now in Mikatakaminaka District). (1 village)
 On March 3, 2006 - The village of Natashō was merged into the expanded town of Ōi (in Ōi District). Onyū District was dissolved as a result of this merger.

References

See also
 List of dissolved districts of Japan

Former districts of Fukui Prefecture